Helmi Dresen (4 July 1892- 25 September 1941) was an Estonian translator, poet, and Esperantist. She was the older sister of Hilda Dresen. She was shot by the Nazis.

Life 
She was born in Kolga. She learned Esperanto in 1912.

On 22 June 1941, the Nazis launched Operation Barbarossa, resulting in the capture of Tallinn. Several Esperantists were arrested and shot, including Helmi Dresen,  and Neeme Ruus.

Works 
 L'okuloj estis bluaj, la haroj el arĝento,

References 

1892 births
1941 deaths
Estonian Esperantists
Estonian translators
Estonian people executed by Nazi Germany